The London Underground 1986 Tube Stock consisted of three prototype electric multiple units built for the London Underground in 1986/87 that led to the development of the 1992 Stock.

History
In 1984, London Transport ordered three different prototype trains to test new materials, construction methods and seating layouts. Two were built by Metro-Cammell at its Washwood Heath factory, and the third by British Rail Engineering Limited at its Derby Litchurch Lane Works.

Each train consisted of twin two-carriage motor car sets, with one car in each set being equipped with a cab. All were built to the same design and were able to operate in four, six or eight car formations, despite each set having different electrical equipment supplied by different manufacturers. The first was delivered in October 1986. To make their identification easier the prototypes were distinctively and individually coloured - red, blue and green.

After an extensive testing program on the deep level tube lines, they sporadically operated in passenger service on the Jubilee line between May 1988 and August 1989 in six-carriage formations where after they entered storage. After being stored for seven years, all cars, except green driving motor No. 16, were scrapped in 1996. Afterwards the latter was stored at Ash Grove bus garage before moving to the London Transport Museum's Acton depot.

The public consultation results show that the blue prototype was the favoured, and provided the core design basis for the 1992 Stock that was built for London Underground's Central line and for the Class 482 which was built for Network SouthEast's Waterloo & City line.

Gallery

See also
London Underground rolling stock
London Underground 1992 Stock
London Underground 1935 Stock
British Rail Class 482

References

External links

 A short video of these trains in public service has been placed on YouTube.
 A second video showing the blue and green cars in service on the Aldwych branch, March 1989 on YouTube.

BREL products
1986
Metropolitan Cammell multiple units
Train-related introductions in 1988